An application strings manager is a software tool primarily designed to optimize the download and storage of strings files used and produced in software development. It centralizes the management of all the product strings generated and used by an organization to overcome the complexity arising from the diversity of strings types, and their position in the overall content workflow.

Uses 
Application strings manager is a kind of software repository for text files, strings, and their corresponding keys. It can be used to store strings files produced by an organization itself, such as product content strings and UI content strings, or for third-party content which must be treated differently for both technical and workflow reasons.

Uses in software development 
To manage the source files used in software development, organizations typically use revision control. The many source files used in software development are eventually built into the product strings (also known as "strings files") which constitute the components of a software product. Consequently, a software product may comprise hundreds and even thousands of individual product strings which must be managed in order to efficiently maintain a coherent and functional software product. This function of managing the product strings is done by an application strings manager. An application strings manager can be thought of as being to strings what revision control is to source files.

Strings managers 
Some factors and features that may be offered by a strings manager include:

 Files manager to store files locally or on network storage
 Workflow 
 High availability through having a redundant set of repository managers work against the same database or file storage
 User restrictions native to the strings manager or integrated with other organizational systems such as LDAP or Single Sign-On servers

Examples of Strings managers 
 Twine
 cdocs
 Phrase

String File Formats

See also 

 Software repository
 Software development

References 

Software development
Software distribution
Product development